The Lekeythang Football Field, also known as Ugyen Academy Stadium, is a football field located in the municipality of Punakha in Bhutan. Its maximum seating capacity is 10,000 people and is the home pitch of Ugyen Academy FC.

References

Football venues in Bhutan
Sports venues in Bhutan